Chris Ashworth is an English graphic designer known for being the executive global creative director for Getty Images and the art director of the magazine Ray Gun in 1997. In addition to his work on Ray Gun, Ashworth also created the brochure and promotional materials for the first MTV Europe Music Awards in collaboration with John Warwicker and Simon Taylor. His work on the brochures earned him more work with MTV, as well as work with Warner Music Group and Image Bank.

Ashworth graduated from the York College of Arts & Technology in 1990 with a degree in graphic design. In collaboration with some friends, he opened a design studio called Orange, which created black and white, easily photocopiable flyers for local nightclubs.

Ashworth is inspired by Swiss design aesthetics, and refers to his own style as "Swiss grit". This style is characterized by hyper detail, barcodes, horizontal lines, and the use of multiple transparent layers.

Published works
Eyes Only with John Holden: , published by Umran Projects, January 1, 1999
Soon: Brands of Tomorrow with Lewis Blackwell: , published by fivedegreesbelowzero press, February 2002

References 

Living people
English graphic designers
Place of birth missing (living people)
Year of birth missing (living people)
English art directors
Getty Images